Apocalypse Never: Why Environmental Alarmism Hurts Us All is a 2020 book by Michael Shellenberger.

Content 
In June 2020, Shellenberger published Apocalypse Never: Why Environmental Alarmism Hurts Us All, in which the author argues that climate change is not the existential threat it is portrayed to be in popular media and activism. Rather, he posits that technological innovation, if allowed to continue and grow, will remedy environmental issues. According to Shellenberger, the book "explores how and why so many of us came to see important but manageable environmental problems as the end of the world, and why the people who are the most apocalyptic about environmental problems tend to oppose the best and most obvious solutions to solving them."

Reception

Prior to publication 
Before publication, the book received favorable reviews from climate scientists Tom Wigley and Kerry Emanuel, and from environmentalists such as Steve McCormick and Erle Ellis, but reviews after publication were mixed. For example, Emanuel said that while he did not regret his original positive review, he wished that "the book did not carry with it its own excesses and harmful baggage."

Positive 
The book has received positive reviews and coverage from conservative and libertarian news outlets and organizations, including Fox News, the Heartland Institute, the Daily Mail, Reason, The Wall Street Journal, National Review, and "climate 'truther' websites".

In National Review, Alex Trembath generally praised the book, writing that "despite the flaws", "Shellenberger ... do[es] a service in calling out the environmental alarmism and hysteria that obscure environmental debates rather than illuminate them. And they stand as outliers in those debates for precisely the reason that they claim: Abjuring environmentalist orthodoxy carries heavy social and professional penalties, so few are willing to do so." However, Trembath criticized some of the book as "nuclear fetishism".

In The Wall Street Journal, John Tierney, a long-standing critic of environmentalism, wrote that "Shellenberger makes a persuasive case, lucidly blending research data and policy analysis with a history of the green movement and vignettes of people in poor countries suffering the consequences of “environmental colonialism.”" In the Financial Times, Jonathan Ford wrote that the book "provide[s] a corrective to many of the green assumptions that dominate the media. And if they make the world a little more questioning of the next polar bear story, that is no bad thing." In the Scientific American, John Horgan said that "Apocalypse Never will make some green progressives mad. But I see it as a useful and even necessary counterpoint to the alarmism being peddled by some activists and journalists, including me.", but criticized the book for arguing too "aggressively for nuclear power" and added that "my main gripe with Shellenberger isn't that he's too optimistic; it's that he's not optimistic enough." The book also received a positive review from Die Welt.

Negative 
In reviewing Apocalypse Never for Yale Climate Connections, environmental scientist Peter Gleick argued that "bad science and bad arguments abound" in Apocalypse Never, writing that "What is new in here isn't right, and what is right isn't new." In a review for the Los Angeles Review of Books environmental economist Sam Bliss said that while "the book itself is well written", Shellenberger "plays fast and loose with the facts" and "Troublingly, he seems more concerned with showing climate-denying conservatives clever new ways to own the libs than with convincing environmentalists of anything." Similarly, environmental and technological social scientists Taylor Dotson and Michael Bouchey have argued that as an "Environmental activist" and "ecomodernist", Shellenberger's writing in his books and on his foundation's website "bombards readers with facts that are disconnected, out of context, poorly explained, and of questionable relevance," and ultimately, his "fanatic, scientistic discourse stands in the way of nuclear energy policy that is both intelligent and democratic."

References 

2020 non-fiction books